The 2009 Cork Senior Hurling Championship was the 121st staging of the Cork Senior Hurling Championship since its establishment by the Cork County Board in 1887. The draw for the 2009 opening round fixtures took place at the County Convention in December 2008. The championship began on 2 May 2009 and ended on 11 October 2009.

Sarsfields were the defending champions.

On 4 September 2009, Castlelyons were relegated from the championship following a 3-9 to 3-12 defeat by Carrigtwohill.

On 11 October 2009, Newtownshandrum won the championship following a 3-22 to 1-12 defeat of Sarsfields. This was their fourth championship title overall and their first in four championship seasons.

Carrigtwohill's Niall McCarthy was the championship's top scorer with 4-27.

Results

Round 1

Round 2

Round 3

Relegation play-offs

Quarter-finals

Semi-finals

Final

Championship statistics

Top scorers

Miscellaneous

 Blarney return to the senior championship for the first time since 1939

References

Cork Senior Hurling Championship
Cork Senior Hurling Championship